Kim Ja-jeom (1588 – January 27, 1652) was a Korean scholar-official of the Joseon dynasty period and Ming-Qing transition. He was one of the disciples of Seong Hon and came from the Andong Kim clan.

He was Joseon's Chief State Councillor from 1645 to 1650, and was an ancestor of Kim Gu, a famous Korean independence activist. 

In 1646, threatened by the return of Im Gyeong-eop to the capital, Kim Ja-jeom paid soldiers to assassinate Im Gyeong-eop.

Family
Great-Great-Grandfather
Kim Seong-dong (김성동, 金誠童; 1452–1495)
Great-Grandfather
Kim Eon (김언, 金漹) (1495 - ?)
Grandfather
Kim Eok-ryeong (김억령, 金億齡) (1529 - ?)
Father
Kim Tak (김탁, 金琢)
Mother
Lady Yu of the Gigye Yu clan (기계 유씨); Yu Hong's eldest daughter.
Grandfather: Yu Hong (유홍, 兪泓; 1524–1594)
 Sibling(s)
 Older brother: Kim Ja-gyeom (김자겸, 金自兼); died young
 Sister-in-law: Yi Yea-sun (이예순), Lady Yi of the Yeonan Yi clan (연안 이씨, 延安 李氏)
 Wive(s) and children:
 Lady Byeon of the Hwangju Byeon clan (황주 변씨) – No issue.
 Unnamed woman
 Son - Kim Ryeon (김련, 金鍊) (? - 1651)
 Son - Kim Sik (김식, 金鉽) (1620–1651)
 Grandson - Kim Se-ryeong (김세룡, 金世龍) (? - 1651)
 Granddaughter-in-law - Princess Hyomyeong (효명옹주) (1637 - 1700)
 Son - Kim Jeong (김정, 金鋌; 1631–1651)
Unnamed concubine – No issue.

In popular culture
Portrayed by Kim Soon-chul in the 1981 KBS1 TV Series Daemyeong.
Portrayed by Kim Sung-chan in the 1995 KBS2 TV Series West Palace.
Portrayed by Park Geun-hyung in 2009 MBC TV series The Return of Iljimae.
Portrayed by Kwon Tae-won in 2012 MBC TV series The King's Doctor.
Portrayed by Jung Sung-mo in 2013 JTBC TV series Blooded Palace: The War of Flowers.
Portrayed by Park Yeong-gyu in 2014 tvN TV series The Three Musketeers.
Portrayed by Jo Min-ki in 2015 MBC TV series Splendid Politics.
Portrayed by Yang Hyun-min in the 2021 MBN TV series Bossam: Steal the Fate.

See also 
 Kim Gu
 Hyojong of Joseon
 Injo of Joseon
 Kim Jip
 Injo coup

References

External links 
 Kim Ja-Jeom 
 Kim Ja-Jeom 

1588 births
1652 deaths
Neo-Confucian scholars
Korean educators
People from South Jeolla Province
Korean male poets
17th-century Korean poets
Andong Kim clan
People executed by dismemberment